Penelope Diane Olsen is an Australian ornithologist and author.  She has worked with CSIRO as an experimental officer and an Honorary Research Associate as well as being an ARC Postdoctoral Fellow at the Australian National University.  She is also internationally recognised as an expert on raptors and was involved in the conservation work on Norfolk Island for the Norfolk Island Boobook.  She was President of the Australasian Raptor Association 1984–1989.  In 1997 she was awarded the Royal Australasian Ornithologists Union's D.L. Serventy Medal for excellence in published work on birds in the Australasian region. Olsen formerly edited Wingspan, an ornithology magazine published by Birds Australia.

Bibliography

Monographs

 Olsen, Penny. (2005). Wedge-tailed Eagle. Australian Natural History Series. CSIRO Publishing: Melbourne.

 Olsen, Penny. (2010). Upside Down World: Early European Impressions of Australia's Curious Animals, National Library of Australia: Canberra.
 Olsen, Penny. (adapted). (2010). The Best Nest, National Library of Australia: Canberra.  (pbk)
 Olsen, Penny. (2012). Our Nest is Best!, National Library of Australia: Canberra.  (hbk)
 Olsen, Penny. (2013). Have You Seen My Egg?, National Library of Australia: Canberra.  (pbk)

Articles

References

Anon. (1997). D.L. Serventy Medal 1997: Citation. Penelope Diane Olsen. Emu 97: 262.
Robin, Libby. (2001). The Flight of the Emu: a hundred years of Australian ornithology 1901–2001. Carlton, Vic. Melbourne University Press. 

Olsen, Penny
Olsen, Penny
Living people
Year of birth missing (living people)
Australian women scientists